South African singer-songwriter Mlindo the Vocalist has released two studio album and five singles, including six as featured.

Studio albums

Singles

As featured artist

References

External links 
 

Discographies of South African artists